Qezel Bolagh (also Romanized as Qezel Bolāgh; also known as Ghezel Bolagh, Kizil Bulāk, and Qizil Bualāq) is a village in Avajiq-e Shomali Rural District, Dashtaki District, Chaldoran County, West Azerbaijan Province, Iran. At the 2006 census, its population was 360, in 87 families.

References 

Populated places in Chaldoran County